15693/15694 Barak Valley Express was a daily mail/express train that used to connect Silchar (the south Assam town) to Lumding Jn, in Northeast India. But the train was cancelled from September 2014 due to gauge conversion in the North Cachar Hills section of North East Frontier Railway, part of Indian Railways. Though it was a mail/express type train, due to its timings and halts it was considered as a passenger train.

The name of train also features in the opening scene of 1998 bollywood superhit movie Dil Se starring Shahrukh Khan, Manisha Koirala and Preity Zinta.  

Transport in Silchar
Transport in Lumding
Rail transport in Assam